The Lost Tribe is a 1985 New Zealand horror film directed by John Laing. Starring John Bach and Darien Takle, it follows a man and his sister-in-law journeying into a mysterious island inhabited by the tribe Huwera Maori. It was produced in 1982 but not theatrically released in New Zealand until 1985.

Plot
Anthropologist Max Scarry (John Bach) mysteriously vanishes following his voyage to the island of Fjordland as part of his study on the reclusive Kiwi tribe Huwera Maori. The police believe him to be guilty of murder, after they find a woman's corpse in his island retreat. Max's spouse Ruth (Darien Takle) accompanies her brother-in-law Edward (also Bach) in uncovering the truth. They venture into the eerie island and are haunted by ghastly happenings. Finally, Edward snaps under mental pressure and his brother, apparently having died, possesses his body during a supernatural Huwera Maori procession.

Production
The Lost Tribe marked acclaimed New Zealand director John Laing's second directorial effort. In addition, Laing wrote the script of the film and served as producer. Thomas Burstyn signed on as cinematographer. Principal photography ended in 1982.

Release
The film was only released in 1985. It had earlier on won the critics' approval after winning awards at both the 1983 Sitges Film Festival and the Orleans Film Festival. It was screened for some time in September 1985 at the Berkeley Art Museum and Pacific Film Archive (BAM/PFA)'s New Zealand Cinema. In evaluating the film, John Parker of Metro concluded that "[i]t is impossible to say much more without spoiling a very fine movie with an intriguing story for you to find out for yourselves".

Reception

References

External links
 
 
 

1985 films
1985 horror films
1985 in New Zealand
1980s adventure films
New Zealand horror films
Films about Māori people
Films directed by John Laing
1980s English-language films